Comitas kamakurana is a species of sea snail, a marine gastropod mollusk in the family Pseudomelatomidae.

Description
The size of the shell varies between 40 mm and 75 mm.

(Original description) The fusiform shell is much elongated. The siphonal canal is nearly as long as the spire . The color of the shell is dull brown, with an ill-defined light band around the middle. The spire is attenuated. The whorls are very convex, almost angular, concave above and nearly smooth, appressed at the suture. The shell is sculptured with numerous short vertical folds which do not extend on the body whorl below the level of the upper angle of aperture, and become obsolete on its latter half; and numerous subequal, crowded spiral cords throughout. The aperture is nearly half the length of shell, long-elliptical above, passing into a long, open, straight siphonal canal below. The anal sinus is wide and rather shallow. The outer lip is gently arched forward.

Distribution
This species occurs in the Pacific Ocean off the Philippines and Japan.

References

 Sysoev, A.; Bouchet, P. (2001). Gastéropodes turriformes (Gastropoda: Conoidea) nouveaux ou peu connus du Sud-Ouest Pacifique = New and uncommon turriform gastropods (Gastropoda: Conoidea) from the South-West Pacific. in: Bouchet, P. et al. (Ed.) Tropical deep-sea benthos. Mémoires du Muséum national d'Histoire naturelle. Série A, Zoologie. 185: 271-320.

External links
 
 

kamakurana
Gastropods described in 1895